The Restaurant Casa Marieta is a centenary establishment recognized by the "Círculo de Restaurantes Centenarios de España",

located in Independence Square, Girona, also well-known like Sant Agustí Square, because formerly the convent of Sant Agustí had been risen there. The present name is given by the war of 1808 against Napoleon Bonaparte (War of Spanish Independence).

History 
According to the Diari de Girona
 in chronicle signed by Josep M. Bartholomeu, the origins of Casa Marieta are located in 1890 or 1892 related with the establishment of the San Agustín's Square. At the beginning, this establishment was known as "Bar Trol", although others also called it "Can Bartrol" and even like "Ca la Bartrola"
. "Since Maria Vinyoles, well-known like the Marieta, acquired the boardinghouse of "Can Bartrol", who already was the renter and was in charge of the management, has passed three generations".

Lamentably, in those days, the city council did not take a complete registry of enterprise activities and opening licenses of establishments yet it seems that initially, number 5 of square was destined to boardinghouse and restaurant, whereas number 6 was the premises "dedicated to leave carriage and cattle"
. In 1901, Mrs. Maria Vinyoles, married with Mr. Celestino Teixidor, acquired the business where she was working from childhood.

This establishment was combining the activities of catering and lodging. They were many citizens who went over there, either to have a good food after spending days at the market, or to overnight if it was required by theirs enterprise activities. As we told before, on San Agustín square, the market of fruits and vegetables of the city was celebrated. Years later, around 1917, the business was extended towards boardinghouse and therefore to complete service which allowed travelers to live in Mrs. Maria's house.

In 1924 Mrs. Maria Vinyoles bought the premises
 to make improvements but finally did not take place due to the granted permission was not suitable for those improvements. However, improvements were requested a second time a month later,
 although the city council had to give back the amount of the rate of work since it was not carried out.

Later, the references to Casa Marieta are constant on newspapers of those days, as much for business reasons or for other several. As an example the newspaper "El Pirineo" published the 23 of October 1939 gratefulness done by the Social Aid and textually says, "Today we make public the Characteristic of the reputed boardinghouse Casa Marieta established on Independence's Square of this City"

Prizes and recognitions 
Prizes "Destí Girona"

References

External links 

 Casa Marieta.

Companies based in Catalonia
Restaurants in Catalonia